Calico River Rapids is a themed river rapids ride located at Knott's Berry Farm in Buena Park, California which opened on May 17, 2019.

Overview
The ride is a re-imagining of the park's former white water ride: Bigfoot Rapids. Calico River Rapids provides a new back story of Ghost Town and takes place during the early days of Knott's Ghost Town. Moreover, the ride's backstory provides the introduction of two new characters in the fictional town of Ghost Town, Potts and Colter. Both of these characters served as the focal background story of Ghost Town and are played as actual characters during Knott's summer Ghost Town Alive season. Calico River Rapids provides guests an experience of setting the Calico River which Potts and Colter explored leading to the discover of the Calico River Territory. The ride was previously known as Bigfoot Rapids opened in 1987 and was originally constructed by Intamin. Towards the end of 2018, Knott's Berry Farm along with the efforts of Garner Holt Productions and Chrestensen Design revamped the attraction as a whole new themed experience with roughly 20 new animatronic figures as part of the extensive refurbishment Since the ride's opening, Calico River Rapids has been well received by park visitors in part due to its much improved theming from its previous incarnation (Bigfoot Rapids) and has become one of the park's best family rides.

History
Calico River Rapids is a re-imagined river rapids ride previously known as "Bigfoot Rapids". Bigfoot Rapid's opened in 1987 as part of a new land at Knott's Berry Farm. The ride was formerly in an area called "Wild Water Wilderness" but was never theoretically part of the well themed Ghost Town. The ride's featured trees throughout its surrounding area but minimal theming. Along the ride was formerly known as Bigfoot Rapids, the ride was never themed or featured any Bigfoot appearance. As there was little to no theming about bigfoot, it served to be major criticism of the attraction. The ride's age and Knott's Berry Farm commitment to returning to its theme park roots were major factors which led to the retheming of the former Bigfoot attraction. Towards the end of the 2018 season, Knott's Vice President of entertainment, Ken Parks, encouraged the park to close down the ride for extensive refurbishment and rethemed and reopened it as Calico River Rapids for the 2019 season. The ride reopened as Calico River Rapids on May 17, 2019 to large crowds.

Ride experience

See also
Timber Mountain Log Ride ; Knott's Berry Farm other themed water ride

References 

Water rides manufactured by Intamin
River rapids rides
Knott's Berry Farm
Fur trade
Bigfoot in popular culture
Western (genre) amusement rides